Zheng Xiaosong (September 1959 – 20 October 2018) was a Chinese politician and diplomat. He was Director of the Macau Liaison Office, a ministerial-level position, until he fell to his death from his residence in October 2018. He formerly served as Deputy Director of the International Liaison Department of the Chinese Communist Party, Vice Governor of Fujian Province, and secretary-general of the Fujian Provincial Committee of the Chinese Communist Party (CCP).

Zheng was a member of the 19th Central Committee of the Chinese Communist Party and a delegate to the 13th National People's Congress.

Life and career 
Zheng was born in September 1959 in Beijing, China. He graduated from the University of Oslo with a degree in Norwegian language and received diplomatic training at the University of Oxford from 1996 to 1997.

For most of his career Zheng served in diplomatic and international finance positions, including first-grade secretary of the Western Europe Bureau of the Chinese Ministry of Foreign Affairs, Director of the International Department of the Chinese Ministry of Finance, Assistant Finance Minister, and Chinese Executive Director of the Asian Development Bank.

Zheng was promoted to major political posts after Party General Secretary Xi Jinping came to power in 2012. He was appointed Vice Governor of Fujian Province in July 2013, and later became a member of the standing committee and secretary-general of the Fujian Provincial Committee of the Chinese Communist Party (CCP).

In 2016, Zheng was transferred back to Beijing to serve as Deputy Director of the International Liaison Department of the Chinese Communist Party. A month before the 19th National Congress of the Chinese Communist Party (CCP), he was promoted to Director of the Macau Liaison Office, a ministerial-level position in charge of relations between the central government and the Macau Special Administrative Region. He was elected as a member of the 19th Central Committee of the CCP.

Death 
On 20 October 2018, Zheng died in Macau after falling from a tall building where he lived. He was 59. The Hong Kong and Macau Affairs Office in Beijing issued a statement saying that he had suffered from depression, with the implication that he had committed suicide. On Chinese social media many expressed concern and sadness about his depression, but others noted that at least 7 other Chinese officials have fallen from buildings this year, with one injured and at least 6 dead. Although there is no evidence that Zheng was suspected of corruption, in recent years hundreds of mid-level Chinese officials accused of corruption have died, reportedly by suicide, although observers have doubted such accounts.

Allegation related to visit by Xi Jinping
Zheng died just days before the 23 October opening of the Hong Kong–Zhuhai–Macau Bridge, the world's longest sea crossing linking Macau and Hong Kong. Bruce Lui Ping-kuen, convener of Hong Kong's Independent Commentators Association, claimed that in order to avoid speculation that might disturb Party General Secretary Xi Jinping's visit for the opening of the bridge, Beijing had been too quick to conclude that Zheng had died while suffering from depression, a conclusion they announced even before the completion of the investigation by the Macao police. Such reported suicides have been much more common during Xi's leadership than during that of his predecessor Hu Jintao. The Hong Kong and Macau Affairs Office, which announced that his death had been due to depression, has been investigated for corruption since 2016 by the Central Commission for Discipline Inspection and criticized by it for its "six sins", and other Hong Kong and Macao official organizations have also been suspected of corruption.

Footnotes

References 

1959 births
2018 deaths
People's Republic of China politicians from Beijing
Chinese Communist Party politicians from Beijing
University of Oslo alumni
Alumni of the University of Oxford
Chinese diplomats
Deaths from falls
Members of the 19th Central Committee of the Chinese Communist Party
Political office-holders in Fujian
Political office-holders in Macau
Chinese politicians who committed suicide